Alberto Negrin (born 2 January 1940) is an Italian film director and screenwriter, known for his historical, nostalgic and political films.

Negrin started his career as a fine art photographer. In 1962 he debuted as an assistant stage director, collaborating with Orazio Costa and Giorgio Strehler.

In a career spanning over four decades, Negrin has directed over 30 films and series, including the giallo film Enigma rosso (1978), Mussolini and I (1985), starring Bob Hoskins, Anthony Hopkins and Susan Sarandon, the TV miniseries The Secret of the Sahara (1987) (with Ben Kingsley), Voyage of Terror: The Achille Lauro Affair (1989) (with Burt Lancaster), Tower of the Firstborn, Perlasca – Un eroe Italiano (2002), Il Cuore nel Pozzo (2005) and Mi Ricordo Anna Frank. Negrin is also known for his long-standing association with composer Ennio Morricone, who composed music for thirteen Negrin's feature films since 1987.

The historical drama film Perlasca – Un eroe Italiano earned him a Telegatto Award for Best TV movie. Il Cuore nel Pozzo, a film about the Foibe massacres and Istrian–Dalmatian exodus, was watched by 17 million people on its first broadcast in Italy.

Theater
 Atomo, storia di una scelta (1965)
 Il bandito (1966)
 Sentite, buona gente, Peppino Marotto, poeta orgolese (film-documento) (1967)
 Colui che dice di sì e colui che dice di no (1969)
 Operai (film per il "Piccolo") (1969)
 Interrogatorio alla Avana (1972)

Filmography
 Platero y yo (1968)
 Inchieste televisive in America Latina (1968)
 Il gatto con gli stivali (1969)
 Kennedy contro Hoffa (1970)
 La rosa bianca (1971)
 Astronave Terra (1971)
 La risposta di Peppino Manca (1971)
 Racket (1972)
  (1972, TV miniseries)
 Il Picciotto 1973)
 L'Olandese scomparso (1974)
 Processo per l'uccisione di Raffaele Sonzogno giornalista romano (1975)
 Mayakowskji (1976)
 La spia del regime (1976)
 Il delitto Notarbartolo (1977)
 Volontari per destinazione ignota (1977)
 Red Rings of Fear (1978)
 La promessa (1979)
 Bambole: scene di un delitto perfetto (1980)
 Le multinazionali (1980)
 La quinta donna (1982)
 Mussolini and I (1985)
 The Secret of the Sahara (1987)
 Voyage of Terror: The Achille Lauro Affair  (1989)
 Missus (1994)
 Tower of the Firstborn (1999)
 Nanà (2001)
 Perlasca – Un eroe Italiano (2001)
 Ics - L'amore ti dà un nome (2003)
 Il Cuore nel Pozzo (2005)
 Bartali: The Iron Man (2006)
 L'ultimo dei Corleonesi (2007)
 Pane e libertà (2009)
 Mi Ricordo Anna Frank (2009)
 L'isola (2012)
 Un mondo nuovo (2014), TV series
 Qualunque cosa succeda (2014), TV miniseries
 Tango per la libertà (2016), TV miniseries

References

External links

1940 births
Italian film directors
Living people
Italian screenwriters
Italian male screenwriters